Madeleine Gough (born 8 June 1999) is an Australian competitive swimmer. She competed in the women's 1500 metre freestyle at the 2019 World Aquatics Championships held in Gwangju, South Korea. She finished in fifth place in the final.

In 2021, she made her Olympic debut at the Tokyo games. She qualified for the final of the women's 1500m freestyle event, but finished in 8th place in the race.

References

External links
 

1999 births
Living people
Place of birth missing (living people)
Australian female freestyle swimmers
Swimmers at the 2020 Summer Olympics
Olympic swimmers of Australia
People from Coffs Harbour
Sportswomen from New South Wales
21st-century Australian women